Uziel Amin García Martínez (born 9 April 2001) is a Mexican professional footballer who plays as a full-back for Liga MX club Atlético San Luis.

International career
García was called up by Raúl Chabrand to participate with the under-21 team at the 2022 Maurice Revello Tournament, where Mexico finished the tournament in third place.

Career statistics

Club

References

External links

 
 

Living people
2001 births
Mexico youth international footballers
Association football defenders
Atlético San Luis footballers
Liga MX players
Footballers from San Luis Potosí
People from Rioverde, San Luis Potosí
Mexican footballers